Lepidogma megaloceros is a species of snout moth in the genus Lepidogma. It was described by Edward Meyrick in 1934, and is known from the  Democratic Republic of the Congo (it was described from Elisabethville).

References

Moths described in 1934
Epipaschiinae